Pomaderris oblongifolia is a species of flowering plant in the family Rhamnaceae and is endemic to eastern Victoria. It is a slender shrub with densely hairy young stems, oblong to narrowly egg-shaped leaves and panicles of hairy, greenish to deep maroon flowers.

Description
The upper surface of the leaves is mostly glabrous and the lower surface is densely covered with soft greyish or rust-coloured, star-shaped hairs. The flowers are greenish to deep maroon  and covered with hairs similar to those on the leaves. Flowering occurs from November to January.

Taxonomy
Pomaderris oblongifolia was first formally described in 1990 by Neville Grant Walsh in the journal Muelleria from specimens collected near Buchan in 1988. The specific epithet (oblongifolia) refers to the characteristic oblong leaf shape.

Distribution and habitat
This pomaderris grows in gorges of the Snowy River between McKillops Bridge and Buchan, and in gorges on the nearby Little River in eastern Victoria.

References

Flora of Victoria (Australia)
oblongifolia
Plants described in 1990
Taxa named by Neville Grant Walsh